André Viger,  (September 27, 1952 – October 1, 2006) was a French Canadian wheelchair marathoner and Paralympian. He took part in five consecutive Summer Paralympic Games in athletics from 1980 to 1996, winning a total of three gold, three silver and four bronze medals.

Biography
Born in Windsor, Ontario, Viger grew up in Sherbrooke, Quebec. He lost the use of his legs following a traffic accident at age 20. He won the men's wheelchair division of the Boston Marathon in 1984, 1986 and 1987. In 1987, he was made a Knight of the National Order of Quebec. In 1989, he was made an Officer of the Order of Canada for being "a source of encouragement for young athletes and a role model for young people everywhere". In 1993, he was inducted into the Terry Fox Hall of Fame, and in 2005, the Paralympic Hall of Fame.

After retiring from athletics, he began a career as a businessman and started a wheelchair manufacturing company. He died of cancer on October 1, 2006.

In 2013, Viger was inducted into Canada's Sports Hall of Fame.

References

External links
 
 André Viger at the Canadian Paralympic Committee
 
 

1952 births
2006 deaths
Deaths from cancer in Quebec
Franco-Ontarian people
Knights of the National Order of Quebec
Officers of the Order of Canada
Paralympic track and field athletes of Canada
Canadian Disability Hall of Fame
Athletes (track and field) at the 1980 Summer Paralympics
Athletes (track and field) at the 1984 Summer Paralympics
Athletes (track and field) at the 1988 Summer Paralympics
Athletes (track and field) at the 1992 Summer Paralympics
Athletes (track and field) at the 1996 Summer Paralympics
Paralympic gold medalists for Canada
Paralympic silver medalists for Canada
Paralympic bronze medalists for Canada
Sportspeople from Sherbrooke
Sportspeople from Windsor, Ontario
Wheelchair racers at the 1984 Summer Olympics
Wheelchair racers at the 1988 Summer Olympics
Medalists at the 1980 Summer Paralympics
Medalists at the 1984 Summer Paralympics
Medalists at the 1988 Summer Paralympics
Medalists at the 1992 Summer Paralympics
Canadian male wheelchair racers
People with paraplegia
Paralympic medalists in athletics (track and field)